Carmen Luz Beuchat Leiva (born 27 December 1941) is a Chilean artist, choreographer, and dancer recognized for her development of postmodern dance in the United States during the 1960s and 1970s.

Biography
Carmen Beuchat was born in Santiago, Chile in 1941. She began her career in classical and modern dance as a student of Yerka Luksic, at four years of age.

In 1964 she formed Trío 65, the first Chilean independent dance company, with dancers Gaby Concha and Rosa Celis. Towards the end of the same decade, she migrated to the United States, actively participating in the New York art scene. A founding member of the collective The Natural History of the American Dancer, Carmen Beuchat developed a link between her visual and choreographic work with a strong emphasis on spatial composition, incorporating the use of mobile structures in her choreography, presenting her work in spaces such as the 112 Greene St. Gallery, Whitney Museum, The Kitchen, Judson Church, Everson Museum of Art, and the Bronx Museum, among many others.

During her life, Carmen Beuchat has collaborated with artists such as Juan Downey, Gordon Matta-Clark, Richard Nonas, and Enrique Castro-Cid. She was an assistant to Robert Rauschenberg, danced in the first company of Trisha Brown, and in Kei Takei's Moving Earth Dance Company. She participated in projects with Jaime and Alfonso Barrios and photographer Marcelo Montealegre.

In Chile she is recognized as the originator of contact improvisation and other postmodern dance techniques. In the midst of the military dictatorship, during her trips to Chile in 1977 and 1985, she conducted dance workshops promoting an aesthetic transformation in the local scene, promoting a philosophy of democratization around the body in movement.

In the 1990s she settled in Chile, serving as director of the Dance School of University ARCIS, and generating a series of creative and educational projects in Santiago and Valparaíso.

She currently lives in Quetroleufú, Araucanía Region, where she receives constant visits from students, dancers, and creators.

Distinctions
 2005 Pablo Neruda Order of Artistic and Cultural Merit

Works

Collaborations

References

External links
 

1941 births
20th-century dancers
21st-century dancers
Artists from Santiago
Chilean female dancers
Living people
University of Chile alumni
Women choreographers